Amster is a surname. Notable people with the surname include:

I. Jonathan Amster (born 1955), American chemist
James Amster (1908–1986), American interior decorator
Mauricio Amster 1907–1980), Ukrainian-born Chilean designer
Randall Amster (born 1966), American author, activist, and educator